The  was an infantry division in the Imperial Japanese Army. It was created 4 April 1944 in Utsunomiya, simultaneously with the 44th and 86th divisions. It was a triangular division. The men of the division were drafted through Utsunomiya mobilization district, although the divisional backbone was the 51st division headquarters.

Action
The 81st division was assigned to the 36th army 21 July 1944. Because the troops were engaged in farming for self-sustenance, and of the pronunciation of the divisional call sign, the 81st division was also jokingly called "Agricultural division". The division spent the time until the surrender of Japan 15 August 1945 building fortifications around Yūki, Ibaraki and did not engage in actual combat.

References and further reading

 List of Japanese Infantry Divisions
 Madej, W. Victor. Japanese Armed Forces Order of Battle, 1937-1945 [2 vols] Allentown, PA: 1981
This article incorporates material from the article 第81師団 (日本軍) in the Japanese Wikipedia, retrieved on 20 June 2016.

Japanese World War II divisions
Infantry divisions of Japan
Military units and formations established in 1944
Military units and formations disestablished in 1945
1944 establishments in Japan
1945 disestablishments in Japan